The 2022 World Junior-B Curling Championships was being held from January 3 to 14 at the Kisakallio Sports Institute in Lohja, Finland. The top three men's and women's teams were to qualify for the 2022 World Junior Curling Championships.

On January 4, the Hungarian men's team (Lőrinc Tatár, Ottó Kalocsay, Raul Kárász and Milan Tüske) had to withdraw from the competition due to a positive COVID-19 case within the team. The following day, members of Teams Chinese Taipei, Spain and Slovenia all confirmed positive cases within their teams. On January 6, World Curling Federation cancelled the event due to the outbreak of cases.

Men

Teams

The teams are listed as follows:

Round-robin standings
After Draw 10

Round-robin results

All draw times are listed in Eastern European Time (UTC+02:00).

Draw 1
Monday, January 3, 9:00

Draw 2
Monday, January 3, 14:00

Draw 3
Monday, January 3, 19:00

Draw 4
Tuesday, January 4, 9:00

Draw 5
Tuesday, January 4, 14:00

Draw 6
Tuesday, January 4, 19:00

Draw 7
Wednesday, January 5, 9:00

Draw 8
Wednesday, January 5, 14:00

Draw 9
Wednesday, January 5, 19:00

Draw 10
Thursday, January 6, 9:00

Draw 11
Thursday, January 6, 14:00

Draw 12
Thursday, January 6, 19:00

Playoffs

Quarterfinals
Friday, January 7, 13:00

Semifinals
Friday, January 7, 18:00

Bronze medal game
Saturday, January 8, 10:00

Gold medal game
Saturday, January 8, 10:00

Final standings

Women

Teams

The teams are listed as follows:

Round-robin standings

Round-robin results

All draw times are listed in Eastern European Time (UTC+02:00).

Draw 1
Monday, January 10, 9:00

Draw 2
Monday, January 10, 14:00

Draw 3
Monday, January 10, 19:00

Draw 4
Tuesday, January 11, 9:00

Draw 5
Tuesday, January 11, 14:00

Draw 6
Tuesday, January 11, 19:00

Draw 7
Wednesday, January 12, 9:00

Draw 8
Wednesday, January 12, 14:00

Draw 9
Wednesday, January 12, 19:00

Playoffs

Quarterfinals
Thursday, January 13, 13:00

Semifinals
Thursday, January 13, 18:00

Bronze medal game
Friday, January 14, 10:00

Gold medal game
Friday, January 14, 10:00

Final standings

References

External links

World Junior-B Curling Championships
Sport in Lohja
World Junior-B Curling Championships
World Junior Curling B
World Junior-B Curling Championships
International curling competitions hosted by Finland
World Junior-B Curling
Curling events cancelled due to the COVID-19 pandemic